New Miami High School is a public high school just outside New Miami, Ohio.  It is the only high school in the New Miami Local School District.

Notes and references

External links
 District Website

High schools in Butler County, Ohio
Public high schools in Ohio
Buildings and structures in Hamilton, Ohio